Robert Andrew George Codner (born 23 January 1965) is an English retired professional  footballer.

Football career

Playing career
He played as a midfielder and forward for Leicester City, Dagenham, Barnet, Brighton & Hove Albion, Reading, Peterborough United, Southend United, Stevenage Borough, Aylesbury United, Farnborough Town, Cardiff City, Kettering Town, Dover Athletic, Chesham United, Chertsey Town and Banstead Athletic. He made over 300 appearances in The Football League scoring 40 goals. Codner also represented England semi-professional football team.

Non-playing career
He has since gone on to become a football agent.

References

External links

1967 births
Living people
English footballers
Tottenham Hotspur F.C. players
Leicester City F.C. players
Dagenham F.C. players
Barnet F.C. players
Brighton & Hove Albion F.C. players
Reading F.C. players
Peterborough United F.C. players
Southend United F.C. players
Ilkeston Town F.C. (1945) players
Stevenage F.C. players
Aylesbury United F.C. players
Farnborough F.C. players
Cardiff City F.C. players
Kettering Town F.C. players
Dover Athletic F.C. players
Chesham United F.C. players
Chertsey Town F.C. players
Banstead Athletic F.C. players
English Football League players
National League (English football) players
Association football midfielders
Association football forwards